Maharajah Vikram Dev I or Vikram Dev was the king of Jeypore kingdom from 1758 to 1781. He was born in the Suryavansh Shankara Dynasty that ruled the region since 1443. He succeeded his brother Maharaja Lal Krishna Dev in a military coup in what is described as a critical period when the kingdom was under attack from all directions. The king battled and protected his kingdom from the French East India Company in Malkangiri, Marathas in Umerkote belt and the East India Company - Pusapati alliance in Jeypore and Rayagada. He retransferred the capital from Narayanapatna to Jeypore which had been deserted from the time of Balaram Dev in 1711. In the last years of his reign, the kingdom was demoted to a zamindari after they were defeated by the British. He was the 19th king of the Suryavansh dynasty of Kalinga that previously ruled the kingdom from Nandapur.

Early life 
Vikram Dev was the son of Maharaja Raghunath Krishna Dev and the Sano Maharani (junior Eastern Chalukyan princess). Vikram was fifth in line of succession and was only crowned after his four elder brothers ruled and retired from kinship. He started a rebellion against his brother, King Lal Krishna Dev and succeeded him in 1757 as a result of a successful military coup.

Vikram witnessed the expansion of the kingdom under his father Maharajah Raghunath Krishna and saw its downfall in the reign of his elder brothers - Ram Chandra Dev, Balaram Dev III, Vishwambhar Dev II and Lala Krishna Dev. Till the reign of his father, the kings of Jeypore ruled over the largest kingdom of Kalinga and claimed to be the Maharajas of Kalinga. However, a feud between young princes - Ram Chandra Dev and Balaram Dev III gave opportunity to their minister Viziaram Raz to hatch a conspiracy against the kingdom. This conspiracy later helped the Pusapatis gain independence from Jeypore and establish their capital, Vizianagaram. The later kings, Vishwambhar Dev II and Lal Krishna Dev ruled the kingdom from their new capital in Narayanapatna. The kingdom was suffering from the politics and skirmishes of the Vizianagaram king and his French allies. This need of the hour compelled Vikram Dev to take a stringent step and succeed his brother.

Some accounts also suggest that Viziaram Raz intended to instigate an internal revolt by instigating Vikram Dev against the activities and decisions of his brother and the king which could have been a possible reason behind the fallout.

Reign 
Vikram Dev was crowned in 1758 which was a period of urgency for the kingdom that was facing enemies from all directions. On the eastern realm, the rival chief of Vizianagaram formed an alliance with the British along with the Nizam of Hyderabad, claiming ownership over the whole kingdom of Jeypore. The Southern territory of Malkangiri was being infiltrated by the French and the Northern and Western were under a threat by the Maratha Empire which had conquered almost all of the neighbouring kingdoms. Henceforth, the reign of Vikram Dev was wholly renounced to various battles which debilitated the kingdom from later putting on a challenge against the British.

He married Rajkumari Lalitamani Patta Devi, the princess of Kalahandi which served as a former feudatory but claimed independence with the help of the Marathas during the critical period under Ram Chandra Dev. This marriage alliance proved helpful to Vikram Dev in near future as he evaded to Kalahandi after losing the crucial battle of Jeypore to the British. He later raised an army against the British in Rayagada valley but was defeated yet again.

Battle of Malkangiri 
Malkangiri was in the southern region of Jeypore kingdom. In 1760, the troops of the French East India Company infiltrated this region with an intention of attacking the Marathas. They came as far as the town and were halted by the zamindar of Malkangiri who further informed the king about the confrontation. Evidently, Vikram Dev arrived with his army and drove out the French troops who retreated beyond the river, Godavari.

Battle of Umerkote 

The rising prowess of the Marathas led them to conquer much of India and establish an empire. The eastern kingdoms lying in the region of Odisha, Chhattisgarh, Jharkhand and Bengal were all conquered by the forces of the Maratha Empire. The neighbouring kingdoms of Bastar and Kalahandi State were taken over by the Maratha Generals who wanted control over Jeypore to consolidate their position and battle the British.

The Maratha army began invasion from the Umerkote belt and soon faced the army of Jeypore led by Vikram Dev. Evidently, the Marathas were defeated and driven out of the region and Jeypore remained independent from the Maratha Empire.

Battle of Jeypore 
The ruler of Vizianagaram failed to maintain good relations with the French and joined the British camp in order to usurp the neighbouring kingdoms of Jeypore and Paralakhemundi. In 1765, the British acquired the Northern Circars and three years later Viziaram Raz II wrote to the Madras Presidency stating that the whole kingdom of Jeypore was granted to him by Salabat Jung, Mughal Governor of Deccan on an annual payment of 24,000 rupees. The Madras Government considering the past services of Viziaram Raz, in 1769, granted three important territories of the Jeypore Rajya called Kasipatnam, Nandapur and Madugula to the Raja of Vizianagaram.

In 1775, the kingdom of Paralakhemundi was under an attack by the British which propelled Vikram Dev to assemble a large force in the fort of Rayagada valley. Meanwhile, the British troops along with the army of Vizianagaram attacked Jeypore in the absence of the king. The guarding troops of the fort and the people of Jeypore fought valiantly against much formidable opponents. The description of their brave defense was written by Captain Richard Matthews on 14 February 1775 where he mentioned that his troops came through the pass with great difficulty as the enemies continuously fought with his army when they were only a few miles away from Jeypore.

However, the British took over the capital of Jeypore and the fort was demolished under the instructions of Captain Richard Matthewse. He writes in his memoir:

Vikram Dev prepared for the battle in Rayagada against the British and Vizianagaram but failed against a superior army. Seeing that the defeat was inevitable, he eloped to the neighboring kingdom of Kalahandi. Meanwhile, Viziaram Raz did acquire Jeypore but faced a serious revolt and protests from the denizens who pledged their loyalty to the former dynasty. The protests got violent when the Vizianagaram troops began using force to control the civilians. Therefore, the British government of Madras agreed to return the territories to Vikram Dev under an annual settlement of 40,000 rupees. The kingdom was annexed to the British territories as a Zamindari or tributary baronial estate and Vikram Dev was granted the title of 'Raja' like other zamindars.

Conquest of Bastar 
In 1777, Raja Daryao Deo of Bastar was ousted by his brother Raja Ajmer Singh and the former absconded to Jeypore seeking shelter in the fort of Vikram Dev. Essentially, Raja Daryao was accompanied by Vikram Dev to the capital of Bastar with one hundred cavalry, one hundred swordsmen, twelve thousand infantry, twenty canons and fifteen war elephants and was further joined by thousands of rebel soldiers. The defense of Ajgar Singh collapsed in a day and Daryao Deo was reinstalled on the throne of Bastar. The pargana of Kotpad was presented to Vikram Dev for his services, this pargana had five forts - Umerkote, Churchunda, Raigarh, Kotpad and Podagada.

Death 
Vikram Dev died in 1781 and was succeeded by his eldest son, Ram Chandra Dev II. Meanwhile, his other two sons - Jagganath Dev was made the Raja of Nabarangpur and Narsingh Dev was crowned as the Raja of Gudari, Rayagada.

References 

1701 births
1781 deaths